Through the Gale is the third album of Asaf Avidan & the Mojos in Israel released in 2010 independently after the success of their debut 2008 album The Reckoning and the follow-up 2009 album Poor Boy / Lucky Man.

Track list
"Hoist Up the Colors!"
"Through the Gale"
"The Sirens & the Sea"
"At the Edge of the Map"
"Sailors Are We"
"Poseidon's Fury Unleashed"
"Oh Western Wind"
"Turn of the Tides Under the Northern Lights"

Credits
All songs written and composed by Asaf Avidan.
Arranged by Asaf Avidan & the Mojos and Ori Winokur.
Produced by Ori Winokur and Asaf Avidan.
Recorded by – Ronen Hajaj at Ogen Studio
Ogen assistant engineers – Yair Nisimov, Shlomi Gvili, Sharon Inbar
Mixed by – Ronen Hajaj on the road in different hotel rooms
Summing at Pluto Studios
Mastered by Alan Ward at Electric City Mastering
Instruments
Asaf Avidan – Vocals, Guitar
Hadas Kleinman – Cello
Ran Nir – Bass
Roi Peled – Guitar
Yoni Sheleg – Drums & Percussion
Additional instruments
Ori Winokur – Piano & backing vocals on track 5
Asaf Avidan – Synth on tracks 2, 3
Hadas Kleinman – backing vocals on track 3
All the Mojos – backing vocals on track 5
CD, Cover & Map Design by – Noa Dolberg
Illustrations by Reno Marca & Lilach Shmilovit
Art Direction – Asaf Avidan

References

2010 albums
Asaf Avidan albums